Legend of the Liquid Sword is the fourth solo studio album by American hip hop artist GZA, a member of the Wu-Tang Clan. It was released December 10, 2002. The album is named after the kung fu film Legend of the Liquid Sword. In the songs "Did Ya Say That", and "Knock Knock", GZA focuses on the politics of record labels, and expresses his issues in dealing with record companies over artistic goals in music.

Critical reception

Brett Berliner of Stylus Magazine said: "The man simply is brilliant, and although these aren’t the lyrics that will appeal to most, they are certainly some of the best. It’s just like why simple books appeal to the masses – most people can’t comprehend this much depth."

Jonah Weiner of Blender magazine stated: "This abstract skill put his 1995 masterpiece, Liquid Swords (name-checked here in the title and every other song), in the running for best Wu solo album, but dense, volatile production pushed it over the top — the prosaic soul loops here are solid enough, but fall short of the legend."

The overall sound of the album conflicted much of the mainstream hip-hop at the time of its release. Samira Niazy of prefixmag.com rated the album 8.0 out of 10 and concluded: "One of the things you'll notice is that GZA's more unique and real style shines through because he focuses on lyricism rather than distracting the listener with loud instrumental background noise. It draws your attention to his best asset, his distinct style. Thankfully, Legend of the Liquid Sword sounds nothing like the hip-pop that's on heavy rotation on hip-hop stations right now."

Though many opinions varied on whether the album was the classic "Wu-Tang sound", Ari Levenfeld of PopMatters feels: "If Legend of the Liquid Sword is any indication of the Wu-Tang Clan's efforts to come, it doesn't seem like the group is all that interested in expanding their fan base or growing musically. Maybe they've done what they set out to do. The franchise is working... GZA isn't trying to be something or someone he's not. He's all about the original recipe."

Track listing

Charts

References

2002 albums
GZA albums
MCA Records albums
Albums produced by RZA
Albums produced by Bink (record producer)
Albums produced by DJ Muggs